Francisco Otaviano de Almeida Rosa (26 June 1825 – 28 June 1889) was a Brazilian poet, lawyer, diplomat, journalist and politician. He is famous for translating into Portuguese works by famous writers such as Horace, Catullus, Lord Byron, William Shakespeare, Percy Bysshe Shelley, Victor Hugo and Johann Wolfgang von Goethe, mostly of them for the first time.

He is the patron of the 13th chair of the Brazilian Academy of Letters.

Life
Otaviano was born in Rio de Janeiro in 1825, to Otaviano Maria da Rosa, a doctor, and Joana Maria da Rosa. He entered the Faculdade de Direito da Universidade de São Paulo in 1841, graduating in 1845. Returning to Rio, he started to collaborate for newspapers such as Sentinela da Monarquia, the Official Gazette of the Empire of Brazil, Jornal do Commercio and Correio Mercantil.

From 1867 to 1869 he was the deputy (later senator) of the Empire of Brazil, and served as the negotiator of the Treaty of the Triple Alliance among Brazil, Argentina and Uruguay.

He died in 1889.

Works

 Inteligência do Ato Adicional (1857)
 As Assembleias Provinciais (1869)
 Cantos de Selma (1872)
 Traduções e Poesias (1881)

His most famous poem is "Ilusões da vida" ("Illusions of the life").

References

External links
 Works by Francisco Otaviano at the official site of the Brazilian Academy of Letters 
 Francisco Otaviano's biography at the official site of the Brazilian Academy of Letters 

1825 births
1889 deaths
Patrons of the Brazilian Academy of Letters
Romantic poets
Writers from Rio de Janeiro (city)
Brazilian diplomats
19th-century Brazilian lawyers
Brazilian male poets
Members of the Federal Senate (Brazil)
University of São Paulo alumni
Brazilian journalists
Brazilian monarchists
19th-century journalists
Male journalists
19th-century Brazilian poets
19th-century Brazilian male writers